The Count is Charlie Chaplin's fifth film for Mutual Film Corporation in 1916. Released on September 4, it co-starred Eric Campbell and Edna Purviance.

Synopsis
The tailor's handyman (played by Chaplin) burns a count's trousers while ironing them and is fired. His superior (Campbell) discovers a note explaining the count can't attend a party, and dresses up like one to take his place.

Chaplin also goes to the residence hosting the party, but runs into the tailor. They both then struggle to win the fair maiden, Miss Moneybags (Purviance). Soon, Charlie is distracted by a gypsy girl and the tailor must fend off other suitors. The real Count finally arrives, learns of the imposters and calls the police. Chaplin makes a mad dash through the party and scampers away to safety.

Review
The Count received this positive review from the Chicago Tribune: "It has story, speed, and spontaneity. The fun is not forced--it just bubbles out. A good deal of the originality prevails and utter respectability. Some squeamish folks may take exception to Mr. Chaplin holding his nose while eating strong cheese, scratching his head with a fork, and washing his ears with watermelon juice at the table. But these vulgarities pass quickly and can be forgotten in the stress of the high comedy of the soup and the dance. Mr. Chaplin has his capacity for serious playing, but he is foremost as a clown and here he clowns superbly."

Cast
 Charles Chaplin - Tailor's apprentice
 Edna Purviance - Miss Moneybags
 Eric Campbell - Tailor
 Leo White - Count Broko
 Charlotte Mineau - Mrs. Moneybags
 Albert Austin - Tall Guest
 John Rand - Guest
 Leota Bryan - Young Girl
 Frank J. Coleman - Policeman
 James T. Kelley - Butler
 Eva Thatcher - Cook
 Tiny Sandford - Guest
 Loyal Underwood - Small Guest
 May White - Large Lady

Sound version
In 1932, Amedee Van Beuren of Van Beuren Studios, purchased Chaplin's Mutual comedies for $10,000 each, added music by Gene Rodemich and Winston Sharples and sound effects, and re-released them through RKO Radio Pictures. Chaplin had no legal recourse to stop the RKO release.

See also
Charlie Chaplin filmography

References

External links

Short films directed by Charlie Chaplin
1916 films
American silent short films
American black-and-white films
1916 comedy films
1916 short films
Silent American comedy films
Articles containing video clips
American comedy short films
Mutual Film films
1910s American films